This article is a list of diseases of poinsettia (Euphorbia pulcherrima).

Bacterial diseases

Fungal diseases
This also includes oomycetes

Nematodes, parasitic

Viral and viroid diseases

Miscellaneous diseases and disorders

References 

  Common Names of Diseases, The American Phytopathological Society]

Poinsettia
Poinsettia